Fateh Hyderabad Associated Football Club, also known as Fateh Hyderabad FC, is an Indian professional football club based in Hyderabad, Telangana, that last competed in the I-League 2nd Division, then second tier of Indian football league system.

History

Inception 
Fateh Hyderabad was founded in 2015. The club is owned by Yogesh Maurya and Aditya Narayanan, who studied together at Wharton Business School. They officially launched the club on 4 September at Park Hyatt Hyderabad. Its infrastructure for training and player accommodation is situated at Gundlapochampalli, which is located in the outskirts of Hyderabad. Yogesh Maurya is also a part of the coaching staff and attended AIFF's AFC 'B' Coaching Licence Course in Goa in September 2015 to improve his understanding of the game. Maurya has served as the club's Technical and Sporting Director since its founding.

In February 2017, the club announced a joint venture with Premier Education Group of the UK which will teach physical education in schools throughout Hyderabad.

I-League 2nd Division
The newly founded Fateh Hyderabad AFC made their debut in 2015–16 I-League 2nd Division. Fateh Hyderabad were placed in Group A. Their first match ended in a goalless draw against NEROCA on 14 November 2015. Fateh Hyderabad lost their next six matches in the group stage. On 8 December 2015, Nitin Jyal became the first goalscorer for the club in their 1–2 loss to Mohammedan Sporting. Fateh Hyderabad recorded their first ever win in their eight and final match of the season against Neroca. Shahil Bhatt scored twice in a 2–1 victory for the club. The season also saw 16-year-old Tao Shaiza debut for the club. Shahil Bhatt was the club's top scorer in the season with three goals. Fateh Hyderabad finished last in the group stage, with only one win from their eight matches.

The following 2016–17 season saw significant improvements at Fateh Hyderabad. The club signed three foreign players, including Englishman Adam Mitter from Stafford Rangers FC, who took on the role of captain. They later roped in Fijian player Gurjeet Singh. The club topped their group and remained undefeated in their six group stage matches, thus qualifying for the Final Round of the I-League 2nd Division for the first time in their history. They finished fourth in the Final Round of the league, managing only two wins from ten matches. With nine clean sheets, Fateh Hyderabad had the most clean sheets in the 2nd Division that season. Gambian striker Saihou Jagne was the club's top scorer with four goals.

At the end of the 2016–17 season, the club saw several key players move to ISL clubs. Gurtej Singh, their captain and most experienced defender, was drafted by FC Pune City. Defender Abdul Hakku and goalkeeper Kunzang Bhutia were drafted to Northeast United and ATK respectively.

Ahead of the 2017–18 I-League 2nd Division season, they roped in Ellimishetty Shyam as head coach. On 14 March 2018, club owner Yogesh Maurya announced that Fateh Hyderabad would be moving their home ground to the RDT Stadium in Anantapur for the upcoming 2017–18 season of the I-League 2nd Division. According to Maurya, the poor pitch conditions at the Gachibowli Stadium forced them to move to another stadium. Maurya also disclosed plans for Fateh Hyderabad to have their own stadium in the next few seasons.

Stadium

Fateh Hyderabad Football Club play their home matches at the Lal Bahadur Shastri Stadium.

The Lal Bahadur Shastri Stadium, formerly known as Fateh Maidan, is a football and cricket stadium in Hyderabad, Telangana. The stadium was renamed in 1967 in memory of Lal Bahadur Shastri, India's former Prime Minister. The stadium is situated behind the police control room, between the Nizam College and Public Gardens in Hyderabad. It is the venue for many national and international sporting events, especially football and cricket.

For the 2017–18 season, Fateh Hyderabad moved their home ground to the Anantapur Sports Village Football Ground, in Anantapur, due to poor pitch conditions at the Gachibowli Stadium.

Senior team squad

Current squad

Technical staff

Managerial history
  Ellimishetty Shyam (2015–2018)
  Vimal Arora (2019)
  Abhik Chatterjee (2019–present)

Kit manufacturers and shirt sponsors

Team records

Key
Tms. = Number of teams
Pos. = Position in league
Attendance/G = Average league attendance

Seasons

Honours
 Paral Kote Football Trophy
Winners (1): 2019

See also
 List of football clubs in India
 Hyderabad FC

References

External links
 Fateh Hyderabad A.F.C. at Soccerway
Fateh Hyderabad A.F.C. official at Facebook

Fateh Hyderabad AFC
Association football clubs established in 2015
I-League 2nd Division clubs
2015 establishments in Telangana
Football clubs in Hyderabad